Twinn may refer to:

 Ian Twinn (born 1950), British Conservative politician
 Peter Twinn (1916–2004), British mathematician, World War II codebreaker and entomologist
 Schwinn Twinn, a tandem bicycle
 Walter Patrick Twinn (1934–1997), Canadian Chief of the Sawridge First Nation

See also
 Twin (disambiguation)
 Twinning (disambiguation)